The 22961/22962 Surat–Hapa Intercity Express is an Intercity train belonging to Western Railway zone that runs between  and  in India. It is currently being operated with 22961/22962 train numbers on a weekly basis.

Service

The 22961/Surat–Hapa Intercity Express has an average speed of 57 km/hr and covers 552 km in 9h 45m.
The 22962/Hapa–Surat Intercity Express has an average speed of 56 km/hr and covers 552 km in 9h 55m.

Route and halts 

The important halts of the train are:

Coach composition

The train has standard ICF rakes with a max speed of 110 kmph. The train consists of 21 coaches:

 1 First Class (FC)
 3 AC Chair Car (CC)
 6 Second Sitting (2S)
 9 General Unreserved (GEN)
 2 Seating cum Luggage Rake (SLR)

Traction

From Ahmedabad Junction, train is hauled by a Vatva Loco Shed-based WDM-3A diesel locomotive to Hapa and vice versa.

Rake sharing

The train shares its rake with 12935/12936 Bandra Terminus–Surat Intercity Express and 22959/22960 Surat–Jamnagar Intercity Express.

See also 

 Hapa railway station
 Surat railway station
 Hapa–Shri Mata Vaishno Devi Katra Sarvodaya Express
 Hapa–Madgaon Superfast Express
 Hapa–Bilaspur Superfast Express

Notes

References

External links 
 STATUS & TRAIN NUMBER OF WR’S 26 MAIL/EXPRESS TRAINS WILL CHANGE TO SUPERFAST
 Traffic Block between Nagothane and Roha station
 Konkan railway timetable out

Transport in Jamnagar
Transport in Surat
Intercity Express (Indian Railways) trains
Rail transport in Gujarat